In mathematics, Spencer cohomology is cohomology of a manifold with coefficients in the sheaf of solutions of a linear partial differential operator. It was introduced by Donald C. Spencer in 1969.

References

Sheaf theory
Cohomology theories